Luka Kraljević (born December 4, 1997) is a Slovenian college basketball player for KK Rogaška of the Slovenian League.

Career statistics

College

|-
| style="text-align:left;"| 2017–18
| style="text-align:left;"| Boston College
| 31 || 1 || 9.4 || .357 || .231 || .500 || 1.5 || .5 || .2 || .5 || 1.5
|-
| style="text-align:left;"| 2018–19
| style="text-align:left;"| Boston College
| 22 || 1 || 6.0 || .385 || .000 || .571 || 1.2 || .4 || .2 || .2 || 1.1
|-
| style="text-align:left;"| 2019–20
| style="text-align:left;"| Boston College
| 22 || 1 || 6.4 || .533 || .500 || .500 || .9 || .3 || .0 || .1 || .9
|-
| style="text-align:left;"| 2020–21
| style="text-align:left;"| Boston College
| 3 || 0 || 4.0 || .250 || .333 || – || .3 || .3 || .0 || .3 || 1.0
|- class="sortbottom"
| style="text-align:center;" colspan="2"| Career
| 78 || 3 || 7.4 || .391 || .250 || .514 || 1.2 || .4 || .2 || .3 || 1.2

Personal life
His father is a former professional basketball player Marijan Kraljević.

External links
 Eurobasket.com profile
 FIBA profile
 Boston College Eagles bio

1997 births
Living people
Boston College Eagles men's basketball players
Centers (basketball)
Power forwards (basketball)
Slovenian expatriate basketball people in the United States
Slovenian men's basketball players
Basketball players from Ljubljana
Helios Suns players